Robotech: The Shadow Chronicles is the 2006 animated sequel to the 1985 Robotech television series. It was released on DVD on February 6, 2007.

At Anime Expo 2004, Harmony Gold USA revealed that Robotech: Shadow Force was in production to celebrate the 20th anniversary of Robotech in 2005. The name of the new story arc was soon changed to Robotech: The Shadow Chronicles, and the film was completed on January 27, 2006.

Plot 

In June 2044, the Robotech Expeditionary Force (REF) fleet gathers at Moon Base ALUCE for its final attempt to drive the alien Invid from the Earth. Among the REF fighter pilots are Maia Sterling, Marcus Rush and Alex Romero, all of whom were born in space during the REF mission and have never seen Earth. General Reinhardt sends Vince Grant, captain of the Icarus, on a rescue mission to look for Rick Hunter, chief military commander of all REF forces and a legendary veteran of the First Robotech War.

Despite not having a powerful arsenal, General Reinhardt begins the attack. The assault initially goes well until the Invid Regis launches all of her remaining forces in one final wave. When Reinhardt tries to get an update from the ground forces, he makes contact with resistance leader Scott Bernard. Scott informs Reinhardt that the attack is going poorly. Ending the communication, Scott meets with Ariel, an Invid princess that looks like a young human woman, and Scott's love interest. Ariel hopes to convince her mother, the Invid Regis, that the humans and the Invid can live in peace. As the battle rages on, Ariel finally convinces her mother to leave Earth rather than allow both races to be destroyed. Ariel, after using her teleportation power to travel to Moon Base ALUCE, informs Scott that she had a vision. The Children of the Shadow are planning on attacking the REF. Scott is arrested and interrogated, where he warns of the impending attack.

Suddenly, all contact with Space Station Liberty is lost. When the Icarus arrives, Liberty is under attack by a large fleet of alien ships which have jammed all communications. The battle is going poorly for the REF; capital ships are being destroyed with just one hit. It then becomes clear that the Haydonites are in fact the Children of the Shadow, and that Ariel's warning was true. Captain Grant realizes that every piece of technology the Haydonites have given to the REF contains some kind of Trojan Horse. Unable to restore communications, Grant is unable to warn the remaining ships of these findings, and they are left to fight a hopeless battle.

Louie searches for ships that have no Shadow technology but finds only one: the massive colony ship Ark Angel. Vince orders the evacuation of all station personnel to the Ark Angel. Liberty has the remaining stockpile of Neutron-S missiles, and Vince sets one to self-destruct. The Ark Angel is able to depart as planned. The Haydonites move their fleet towards Liberty as the Neutron-S warheads detonate, destroying Liberty and the entire Haydonite fleet.

As the Ark Angel approaches Earth, Maia and Marcus console each other over the recent events. General Reinhardt gives Vince his new orders: Vince and his crew are to take the Ark Angel and attempt to locate the SDF-3, which may not have been destroyed as initially thought. As Scott and Ariel share a kiss, Louie does his best to reassure a confused and uncertain Janice that "We will win."

Cast
Richard Epcar as Vince Grant
Eddie Frierson as Louie Nichols
Mark Hamill as Commander Darryl Taylor, Wolf Squadron Leader; Haydonite leader
Alexandra Kenworthy as The Regis
Yuri Lowenthal as Marcus Rush
Melanie MacQueen as Marlene Rush
Chase Masterson as Janice Em
Edie Mirman as Maia Sterling
Iona Morris as Jean Grant
Tony Oliver as Admiral Rick Hunter
Arthur Santiago as Alex Romero
Gregory Snegoff as Scott Bernard
Michael Sorich as Sparks
Kari Wahlgren as Ariel
Dan Woren as General Gunther Reinhardt

Release status

Theatrical

Robotech: The Shadow Chronicles premiered at the Cannes Film Market on May 22, 2006 in the Grey One Theatre to an audience of distribution representatives. A number of independent film festivals screened the film during the summer and fall. It was awarded Best Animated Sci-Fi Feature at the International Horror and Sci-Fi Film Festival.

Home video

Harmony Gold and Funimation Entertainment released Robotech: The Shadow Chronicles on DVD on February 6, 2007. A 2-disc collector's edition with additional features was announced by FUNimation at Anime Expo 2007 and released on DVD November 20, 2007. The Blu-ray version was released on September 4, 2008. It is currently available for streaming on Crackle (ad supported streaming service from Sony) in the US.

Madman Entertainment in Australia was the first international distributor to license and release Robotech: The Shadow Chronicles. The film was released on Region 4 DVD on March 14, 2007.

Revelation Films released the film in the United Kingdom on July 23, 2007.

Guangdong Qianhe Audio & Video released the single-disc Standard Edition in the People's Republic of China on August 20, 2007 and the 2-disc Collector's Edition on May 1, 2008.

Music
The musical score was composed by Scott Glasgow, and was recorded with the Prague Philharmonic Orchestra. However, budgetary issues resulted in synthesized elements being mixed into a number of the cues, particularly four of the tracks in the film, and one of the tracks on the soundtrack CD ("Dogfight"). Chase Masterson sang the parts for her robotic character Janice. Melissa Kaplan, the lead singer of the band Universal Hall Pass, vocalized some of the background music.

Reception
Robotech: The Shadow Chronicles has received mixed reception from fans and critics. Justin Sevakis of the Anime News Network gave it an overall rating of C-, commenting that while the movie had good music, it suffered from mediocre animation, a clichéd story and a host of forgettable characters. Slop Reilly of Ain't It Cool News gave it a 1 out of 5 stars, citing a poor screenplay, weak character development and unnatural character design and animation. Tasha Robinson of the Sci Fi Channel's Sci Fi Weekly gave it a B, while Jeffrey Kauffman of DVDTalk recommended it.

Sequel
On February 27, 2007 at the New York Comic Con, Shadow Chronicles director Tommy Yune said, "Robotech: The Shadow Chronicles has been doing good business at retail, and we are currently in production on the sequel." Later that same day, Yune mentioned that the sequel would be a feature movie. The title of the sequel was revealed as Robotech: Shadow Rising, and the film was expected to be released within two years of the time of the announcement, earliest. While the two-year date was stated by Yune to be possible, it was never intended to be an actual release date.

Subsequent announcements in mid-2008 made it clear that little-or-no progress had been made on the film, which was indefinitely postponed, pending developments with the live-action film. At Anime Expo 2009, Kevin McKeever and Yune confirmed that Robotech: Shadow Rising had been put off indefinitely since Warner Bros. Pictures was actively developing a big-budget Robotech live-action feature film.

It was later reported that production of the film had actually ceased in late 2007 after Harmony Gold terminated their deal with FUNimation Entertainment due to creative differences.

At Comic-Con 2012, Tommy Yune announced that Love Live Alive would pave the way for Shadow Rising. As of 2015, the Shadow Rising trademark has been abandoned since 2007.

References

External links

Robotech.com - Harmony Gold's official Robotech website.

2006 films
2006 animated films
Shadow Chronicles
Funimation
South Korean animated films
2000s American animated films
2000s English-language films
2000s South Korean films

ja:ロボテック#Robotech: The Shadow Chronicles(2007)